South Korean rapper, producer and singer-songwriter Woo Ji-ho, better known by his stage name Zico, has released one studio album, four extended plays, and twenty singles. He debuted in 2011 as leader of the boy group Block B, departing the group's label in November 2018 following the end of his contract. He released his first extended play Gallery on December 7, 2015.

Zico is notable for his successful crossover skills in the Korean hip hop scene, maintaining an underground reputation along with mainstream appeal as a Korean idol. He is also a producer of both K-pop and Korean hip hop music. He is part of the hip-hop crew Fanxy Child.

Studio albums

Extended plays

Singles

As lead artist

Collaborations

As featured artist

Soundtrack appearances

Other charted songs

Music videos

Music credits
Music credits adapted from the Korea Music Copyright Association.

See also 
 Block B discography

References 

Discographies of South Korean artists